Our Lady of Sorrows (Spanish: La Dolorosa) is a 1934 Spanish musical drama film directed by Jean Grémillon and starring Rosita Díaz Gimeno, Agustín Godoy and Mary Amparo Bosch. It is an adaptation of the 1930 zarzuela La dolorosa. The film was made at the leading Spanish CEA Studios and shot on location in Aragon with 1500 extras. It was a box office hit on its release. The film was part of a popular European trend of operetta films during the 1930s.

Plot
When Dolores abandons Rafael for a cadet, a sensitive young painter becomes a monk. But when Dolores realizes what she have done, she abandons her child whom she had with another man. Will Rafael be able to help a woman who made a foolish choice?

Cast
Rosita Díaz Gimeno as Dolores
Agustín Godoy as Rafael
Mary Amparo Bosch as Nicasia
Pilar Garcia as Dolores's mother
Eva López as Juanica
María De Araya as Sirvienta
Maruja Berges as Inés
Ramón Cebrián as Perico
José María Linares-Rivas as Natalio 
Anselmo Fernandez as Uncle José 
Alberto López as Uncle Bienvenido 
Luis Llaneza as Don Serafín 
Luis Moreno as prior

References

External links

Spanish musical drama films
Operetta films
1930s musical drama films
Films directed by Jean Grémillon
Films shot in Spain
Spanish black-and-white films
1930s Spanish-language films